2019 is the 13th active year in the history of TKO Major League MMA, a mixed martial arts promotion based in Canada. Initially called Universal Combat Challenge (UCC) before rebranding to TKO Major League MMA in 2003. It was to hold 4 events in 2019.

Event list

TKO Major League 46: Pessoa vs. Gane

TKO Major League 46: Pessoa vs. Gane was to be the first event of TKO Major League MMA in 2019 and was to take place on March 14, 2019. The promotion was forced to cancel the event due to a record 18 fighter's being injured or ill well trying to book the card.

TKO Major League 47: Jourdain vs. Lapilus

TKO Major League 47: Jourdain vs. Lapilus was the 59th event of TKO Major League MMA and took place on April 11, 2019. The prelims aired on Fight Network and the main card on UFC Fightpass.

Results

TKO Major League 48: Sousa vs. Gane

TKO Major League 48: Sousa vs. Gane was the 60th event of TKO Major League MMA and took place on May 24, 2019. The prelims aired on Fight Network and the main card on UFC Fightpass.
 
Results

TKO Major League 49: Matsuba vs. Gordan

TKO Major League 49: Matsuba vs. Gordan was to be the 61st event of TKO Major League MMA in 2019 and was to take place on October 9, 2019. The promotion was forced to cancel the event due to  President of the Organization Stephane Patry being hospitalized.

References

External links
 

TKO Major League MMA
2019 in mixed martial arts